The Battle of Kano was an important battle in 1903 between the British Empire and the Sokoto Caliphate's Kano Emirate in what is now Northern Nigeria.

Background
In 1899, Lord Lugard had proclaimed a British protectorate over much of the Sokoto Caliphate. with the failure of numerous diplomatic overtures to the Caliph, in 1900 a military campaign was launched to subdue the caliphate. 
The British pacification campaign termed Kano-Sokoto Expedition set off from Zaria at the end of January 1903 under the command of Colonel Morland. British officers and N.C.O.s and 800 African rank and file. Apart from a company of mounted infantry and a few gunners, the whole force consisted of infantry. They were supported, however, by four 75-mm. mountain guns, which could if necessary be dismantled and transported by porters, and by six machine guns.

Battle

After sporadic fighting outside the walls of the fort, the British managed to penetrate the defensive parameters of the capital. Kano was mostly left defenseless at the time, the Emir was away with its large contingent Cavalry for the Autumn Campaign at Sokoto. Madakin Kano, a local noble rallied whatever troops there were still in the city to defend it. Despite his efforts, the British successfully took over the city after heavy fight wherein the latter sustained 70 casualties.

Aftermath 
News of the British capture of Kano in February 1903 sent the Emir's Cavalry in a long march to retake the city in the decisive Battle of Kwatarkwashi.

Gallery 
Images of the battlefield.

See also
Battle of Kwatarkwashi

References

Kano 1903
Kano 1903
Kano 1903
History of Northern Nigeria
History of Kano
Politics of Northern Nigeria
1903 in Nigeria